Bures railway station is on the Gainsborough Line, a branch off the Great Eastern Main Line to , in the East of England, serving the village of Bures, which straddles the counties of Essex and Suffolk.

Its three-letter station code is BUE. The platform has an operational length for four-coach trains.

History
The station opened with the opening of the line from Marks Tey to Sudbury as part of the Stour Valley Railway on 2 July 1849.

On 12 July 1887 one person was killed at Bures when part of a runaway train collided with a crossing gate.

The station is managed by Greater Anglia, which also operates all trains serving it, as part of the East Anglia franchise. The original station buildings having been demolished it is now unstaffed and has one platform as the line is single-track. A self-service ticket machine was installed in 2017 as part of a franchise commitment to install ticket machines at all Greater Anglia stations.

In December 2017 Bures was made a request stop during weekday off-peak times and throughout the weekend. However, from May 2019 it reverted to a regular stop with all trains calling.

Services
The typical off-peak service is as follows:

References

External links

History of the railway line from Marks Tey to Sudbury, particularly around Bures
History page at Subterranea Britannica

 

Railway stations in Essex
DfT Category F2 stations
Former Great Eastern Railway stations
Railway stations in Great Britain opened in 1849
Greater Anglia franchise railway stations
1849 establishments in England